E. formosa may refer to:

 Eilema formosa, a Malagasy moth
 Elachura formosa, a passerine bird
 Encarsia formosa, a parasitic wasp
 Enchelynassa formosa, a saltwater eel
 Euchromia formosa, an African moth
 Eudonia formosa, a moth endemic to Hawaii
 Eudromia formosa, a South American tinamou
 Eufriesea formosa, a euglossine bee
 Eulepidotis formosa, a neotropical moth
 Eupithecia formosa, a Chinese moth